

Sigar (or Sigegar; died c. 996) was an Anglo-Saxon Bishop of Wells.

Sigar was a monk at Winchester before becoming abbot of Glastonbury Abbey about 970. He was consecrated in 975 and died 28 June in either 996 or 997.

Citations

References

External links
 

Bishops of Wells
990s deaths
Year of birth unknown
10th-century English bishops